Serratacosa is a genus of wolf spiders. It was first described by L. Y. Wang, X. J. Peng and Z. S. Zhang in 2021, and it has only been found in China.  it contains only three species: S. himalayensis, S. medogensis, and S. multidontata.

See also
 Lycosa
 Hogna
 Pardosa
 List of Lycosidae species

References

Further reading

Lycosidae genera